Albert Bridge is a road bridge over the River Thames connecting Chelsea in Central London on the north bank to Battersea on the south. Designed and built by Rowland Mason Ordish in 1873 as an Ordish–Lefeuvre system modified cable-stayed bridge, it proved to be structurally unsound, so between 1884 and 1887 Sir Joseph Bazalgette incorporated some of the design elements of a suspension bridge. In 1973 the Greater London Council added two concrete piers, which transformed the central span into a simple beam bridge. As a result, today the bridge is an unusual hybrid of three different design styles. It is an English Heritage Grade II* listed building.

Built as a toll bridge, it was commercially unsuccessful. Six years after its opening it was taken into public ownership and the tolls were lifted. The tollbooths remained in place and are the only surviving examples of bridge tollbooths in London. Nicknamed "The Trembling Lady" because of its tendency to vibrate when large numbers of people walked over it, the bridge has signs at its entrances that warn troops to break step whilst crossing the bridge.

Despite many calls for its demolition or pedestrianisation, Albert Bridge has remained open to vehicles throughout its existence, other than for brief spells during repairs. It is one of only two Thames road bridges in central London never to have been replaced (the other is Tower Bridge). The strengthening work carried out by Bazalgette and the Greater London Council did not prevent further deterioration of the bridge's structure. A series of increasingly strict traffic control measures have been introduced to limit its use and thus prolong its life. As a result, it is the second-least busy Thames road bridge in London; only Southwark Bridge carries less traffic.

In 1992,  Albert Bridge was rewired and painted in an unusual colour scheme designed to make it more conspicuous in poor visibility, and avoid being damaged by ships. At night it is illuminated by 4,000 LEDs, adding to its status as a landmark.

History

In 1842 the Commission of Woods, Forests, and Land Revenues recommended the construction of an embankment at Chelsea to free land for development, and proposed a new bridge downstream of Battersea Bridge, and the replacement of the latter by a more modern structure. Work on the Victoria Bridge (later renamed Chelsea Bridge), a short distance downstream of Battersea Bridge, began in 1851 and was completed in 1858, with work on the Chelsea Embankment beginning in 1862. Meanwhile, the proposal to demolish Battersea Bridge was abandoned.

The wooden Battersea Bridge had become dilapidated by the mid-19th century. It had grown unpopular and was considered unsafe. The newer Victoria Bridge, meanwhile, suffered severe congestion. In 1860, Prince Albert suggested that a new tollbridge built between the two existing bridges would be profitable, and in the early 1860s, the Albert Bridge Company was formed with the aim of building this new crossing. A compromise was reached, and in 1864 a new Act of Parliament was passed, authorising the new bridge on condition that it was completed within five years. The Act compelled the Albert Bridge Company to purchase Battersea Bridge once the new bridge opened, and to compensate its owners by paying them £3,000 per annum (about £ in ) in the interim.

Rowland Mason Ordish was appointed to design the new bridge. Ordish was a leading architectural engineer who had worked on the Royal Albert Hall, St Pancras railway station, the Crystal Palace and Holborn Viaduct. The bridge was built using the Ordish–Lefeuvre system, an early form of cable-stayed bridge design which Ordish had patented in 1858. Ordish's design resembled a conventional suspension bridge in employing a parabolic cable to support the centre of the bridge, but differed in its use of 32 inclined stays to support the remainder of the load. Each stay consisted of a flat wrought iron bar attached to the bridge deck, and a wire rope composed of 1,000  diameter wires joining the wrought iron bar to one of the four octagonal support columns.

Construction
Although authorised in 1864, work on the bridge was delayed by negotiations over the proposed Chelsea Embankment, since the bridge's design could not be completed until the exact layout of the new roads being built on the north bank of the river had been agreed. While plans for the Chelsea Embankment were debated, Ordish built the Franz Joseph Bridge over the Vltava in Prague to the same design as that intended for the Albert Bridge.

In 1869, the time allowed by the 1864 Act to build the bridge expired. Delays caused by the Chelsea Embankment project meant that work on the bridge had not even begun, and a new Act of Parliament was required to extend the time limit. Construction finally got underway in 1870, and it was anticipated that the bridge would be completed in about a year, at a cost of £70,000 (about £ in ). In the event, the project ran for over three years, and the final bill came to £200,000 (about £ in ). It was intended to open the bridge and the Chelsea Embankment in a joint ceremony in 1874, but the Albert Bridge Company was keen to start recouping the substantially higher than expected costs, and the bridge opened without any formal ceremony on 23 August 1873, almost ten years after its authorisation. As the law demanded, the Albert Bridge Company then bought Battersea Bridge.

The deck was supported by 32 rigid steel rods suspended from four octagonal cast iron towers, with the towers resting on cast iron piers. The four piers were cast at Battersea and floated down the river into position, at which time they were filled with concrete; at the time they were the largest castings ever made. Unlike most other suspension bridges of the time, the towers were positioned outside the bridge to avoid causing any obstruction to the roadway. At each entrance was a pair of tollbooths with a bar between them, to prevent people entering the bridge without paying.

The bridge acquired the nickname of "The Trembling Lady" because of its tendency to vibrate, particularly when used by troops from the nearby Chelsea Barracks. Concerns about the risks of mechanical resonance effects on suspension bridges, following the 1831 collapse of the Broughton Suspension Bridge and the 1850 collapse of Angers Bridge, led to notices being placed at the entrances warning troops to break step (i.e. not to march in rhythm) when crossing the bridge; Although the barracks closed in 2008, the warning signs are still in place.

Transfer to public ownership

Albert Bridge was catastrophically unsuccessful financially. By the time the new bridge opened, the Albert Bridge Company had been paying compensation to the Battersea Bridge Company for nine years, and on completion of the new bridge became liable for the costs of repairing the by then dilapidated and dangerous structure. The cost of subsidising Battersea Bridge drained funds intended for the building of wide approach roads, making the bridge difficult to reach. It was located slightly further from central London than neighbouring Victoria (Chelsea) Bridge, and demand for the new bridge was less than expected. In the first nine months of its operation £2,085 (about £ in ) were taken in tolls.

In 1877 the Metropolis Toll Bridges Act was passed, which allowed the Metropolitan Board of Works to buy all London bridges between Hammersmith and Waterloo bridges and free them from tolls. In 1879, Albert Bridge, which had cost £200,000 to build, was bought by the Board of Works along with Battersea Bridge for a combined price of £170,000 (about £ in ). The tolls were removed from both bridges on 24 May 1879, but the octagonal tollbooths were left in place, and today are the only surviving bridge tollbooths in London.

Structural weaknesses
In 1884 the Board of Works' Chief Engineer Sir Joseph Bazalgette conducted an inspection of the bridge and found that the iron rods were already showing serious signs of corrosion. Over the next three years the staying rods were augmented with steel chains, giving it an appearance more closely resembling a conventional suspension bridge, and a new timber deck was laid, at a total cost of £25,000 (about £ in ). Despite these improvements, Bazalgette was still concerned about its structural integrity and a weight limit of five tons was imposed on vehicles using the bridge.

In 1926 the Royal Commission on Cross-River Traffic recommended demolition and rebuilding of the bridge to carry four lanes of traffic, but the plan was not carried out because of a shortage of funds in the Great Depression. It continued to deteriorate, and in 1935 the weight limit was reduced to two tons.

Because of its ongoing structural weaknesses, in 1957 the London County Council proposed replacing Albert Bridge with a more conventional design. A protest campaign led by John Betjeman resulted in the withdrawal of the proposal, but serious concerns about the integrity of the bridge continued. In 1964 an experimental tidal flow scheme was introduced, in which only northbound traffic was permitted to use the bridge in the mornings and southbound traffic in the evenings. The bridge's condition continued to deteriorate, however, and in 1970 the Greater London Council (GLC) sought and obtained consent to carry out strengthening work. In April 1972 the bridge was closed for the work to be carried out.

Pedestrianised park proposal

The GLC's solution entailed adding two concrete piers in the middle of the river to support the central span and thus transform the bridge's central section into a beam bridge. The bridge's main girder was also strengthened, and a lightweight replacement deck was laid. The modifications were intended to be a stopgap measure to extend the bridge's life by five years while a replacement was being considered; in the GLC's estimation the work would last for a maximum of 30 years, but the bridge would need to be either closed or replaced well before then.

In early 1973, the Architectural Review submitted a proposal to convert Albert Bridge into a landscaped public park and pedestrian footpath across the river. The proposal proved very popular with the area's residents, and a May 1973 campaign led by John Betjeman, Sybil Thorndike and Laurie Lee raised a petition of 2,000 signatures for the bridge to be permanently closed to traffic. Although the GLC reopened the bridge to traffic in July 1973, it also announced its intention to proceed with the Architectural Review scheme once legal matters had been dealt with.

The Royal Automobile Club campaigned vigorously against the pedestrianisation proposal. A publicity campaign fronted by actress Diana Dors in favour of reopening the bridge was launched, whilst a lobbying group of local residents led by poet Robert Graves campaigned in support of the GLC's plan. Graves's campaign collected over a thousand signatures in support, but was vigorously attacked by the British Road Federation, who derided the apparent evidence of public support for the scheme as "sending a lot of students around to council flats [where] most people will sign anything without knowing what it is all about". A public inquiry of 1974 recommended that the bridge remain open to avoid congestion on neighbouring bridges, and it remained open to traffic with the tidal flow and 2-ton weight limit in place.

Present day

In 1990, the tidal flow system was abandoned and Albert Bridge was converted back to two-way traffic. A traffic island was installed on the south end of the bridge to prevent larger vehicles from using it. In the early years of the 21st century the Chelsea area experienced a growth in the popularity of large four-wheel drive cars (so-called Chelsea tractors), many of which were over the two-ton weight limit; it was estimated that one third of all vehicles using the bridge were over the weight limit. Red and white plastic barriers have been erected along the roadway in an effort to protect the structure from damage by cars.

Between 1905 and 1981, Albert Bridge was painted uniformly green; in 1981 it was repainted yellow. In 1992 it was redecorated and rewired. This has added to its status as a London landmark. The bridge is painted in pink, blue and green to increase visibility in fog and murky light and thus to reduce the risks of ships colliding with the fragile structure during the day. At night, a network of 4,000 low-voltage tungsten-halogen bulbs illuminated the bridge. In 1993 the innovative use of long-life low-energy lighting was commended by Mary Archer, at the time Chairwoman of the National Energy Foundation.

Except for Tower Bridge, built in 1894, Albert Bridge is the only Thames road bridge in central London never to have been replaced. Intended as a temporary measure to be removed in 1978, the concrete central piers remain in place, and although in 1974 its lifespan was estimated at a maximum of 30 years, the bridge is still standing and operational. The Albert Bridge was protected as a Grade II* listed structure in 1975, granting it protection against significant alteration without consultation. It continues to deteriorate. Although proposals have been drawn up by Kensington and Chelsea London Borough Council to repair and rescue it, by March 2008 funds for the repairs were unavailable. As well as structural damage caused by traffic, the timbers underpinning the deck were being seriously rotted by the urine of dogs crossing to and from nearby Battersea Park. With multiple measures in place to reduce traffic flow and prolong the life of the bridge, in 2009 it carried approximately 19,000 vehicles per day, the lowest usage of any Thames road bridge in London other than the little-used Southwark Bridge.

Refurbishment of 2010–2011
The bridge was closed to motor vehicles on 15 February 2010 for refurbishment and strengthening. It was originally expected to remain closed for approximately 18 months, but after the condition of the bridge was found to be worse than expected, it was closed for 22 months. All of the timber in the decking as well as the footway that had rotted away were replaced, with additional timber added for strengthening. Surfaces at the carriageway and pavement decking were replaced. New steel structures were added to strengthen the bridge. All the lightbulbs were changed to more energy-efficient ones. The tollbooths were refurbished. All twelve layers of paint were stripped down until the bare metal was exposed, which was repaired and treated before three new coats of paint were added. The whole project cost £7.2 million of which the Royal Borough of Kensington and Chelsea provided 25% of the cost and the other 75% was provided by Transport for London.

It re-opened on 2 December 2011, when two dogs named Prince and Albert, from nearby Battersea Dogs and Cats Home, walked across the bridge to open it officially. All of the Grade II features were retained.

In popular culture
Its distinctive and striking current appearance has led to its use as a backdrop for numerous films set in the Chelsea area, such as A Clockwork Orange, Absolute Beginners, Sliding Doors, Maybe Baby and Flack. It is also at the centre of a song by The Pogues, "Misty Morning, Albert Bridge" from their Peace and Love album (1989).  The bridge appears on the cover of the Thomas Leer and Robert Rental album The Bridge (1979).

See also
 Albert Bridge, Datchet
 List of bridges in London
 List of crossings of the River Thames

Notes

References

Citations

Bibliography

Further reading

 

Beam bridges
Bridges across the River Thames
Bridges in London
Bridges completed in 1873
Former toll bridges in England
Grade II* listed bridges in London
Grade II* listed buildings in the Royal Borough of Kensington and Chelsea
Grade II* listed buildings in the London Borough of Wandsworth
Road bridges in England
Suspension bridges in the United Kingdom
Transport in the Royal Borough of Kensington and Chelsea
Transport in the London Borough of Wandsworth
1873 establishments in England
Bridge light displays